State Highway 6, commonly referred to as HP SH 6, is a normal state highway that runs through Shimla, Sirmour, Solan in the state of Himachal Pradesh, India. This state highway touches the cities of Chhaila, Neripul, Yashwant Nagar, Oachghat, Kumarhatti.

References

State Highways in Himachal Pradesh
Roads in Himachal Pradesh